Tim Winitana (born 29 April 1987) is a former professional rugby league footballer who played as a  for the Canterbury Bulldogs in the NRL between 2007 and 2010.

Background
Winitana was born in Wellington, New Zealand.

Playing career
Winitana made his debut for Canterbury-Bankstown against the Brisbane Broncos in round 14 of the NRL season on 15 June 2007 after first choice centre Willie Tonga was not selected for disciplinary reasons.

Winitana made 22 appearances the following year in the 2008 NRL season and scored 10 tries as Canterbury finished last on the table.

In 2011, Winitana signed with the Penrith Panthers but made no appearances for the first grade side.  Winitana then moved to Newcastle, New South Wales to play for the Macquarie Scorpions in 2012.

References

External links
 Canterbury Bulldogs profile

1987 births
New Zealand rugby league players
New Zealand Māori rugby league players
New Zealand sportspeople of Samoan descent
Canterbury-Bankstown Bulldogs players
Macquarie Scorpions players
Rugby league centres
Rugby league players from Wellington City
Living people